These Helen Hayes Awards are given annually for excellence in production design for professional theatres in the Washington, DC, metropolitan area. They are given only for resident productions.

Choreography and Musical Direction

Outstanding Choreography in a Resident Production
 1993 Dianne McIntyre - In Living Colors - Theater of the First Amendment
 Linda Garner Miller - H.M.S. Pinafore - Interact Theatre Company
 Marcia Milgrom Dodge - Of Thee I Sing - Arena Stage
 Robert Biederman - 2-2-Tango - The Studio Theatre Secondstage
 Roy Anthony Arauz - Female Hitchikers - Consenting Adults Theatre Company
 1994 Mike Malone - Spunk - The Studio Theatre
 Charles Augins - Five Guys Named Moe - Ford's Theatre
 David Leong - Julius Caesar - The Shakespeare Theatre
 Jim Corti - Dancing TROLLat Lughnasa - Arena Stage
 1996 Patdro Harris - Bessie's Blues - The Studio Theatre
 Brad Waller - Richard III - Folger Shakespeare Library
 Dianne McIntyre - I Could Stop on a Dime and Get Ten Cents Change - Theater of the First Amendment
 Karma Camp - Cabaret - Signature Theatre
 Mike Malone - Black Nativity - The Kennedy Center
 1999 Debbie Allen - Brothers of the Knight - The Kennedy Center
 Charles Augins - The Fix - Signature Theatre in association with Cameron Mackintosh
 Ilona Kessell - West Side Story - Toby's Dinner Theatre
 Irina Tsikurishvili - The Little Tragedies - Stanislavsky Theater Studio
 Karma Camp - Nijinsky's Last Dance - Signature Theatre
 Mark Minnick - Godspell - West End Dinner Theatre
 2000 Irina Tsikurishvili - The Idiot - Stanislavsky Theater Studio
 Baayork Lee - Animal Crackers - Arena Stage
 Ilona Kessell - Follies - Toby's Dinner Theatre
 Ilona Kessell - State Fair - Toby's Dinner Theatre
 Mark Minnick - West Side Story - West End Dinner Theatre
 Patdro Harris - Slam! - The Studio Theatre
 2001 Irina Tsikurishvili - Faust - Stanislavsky Theater Studio
 Debbie Allen - Dreams - The Kennedy Center
 Ilona Kessell - 42nd Street - Toby's Dinner Theatre
 Jodi Moccia - The Rhythm Club - Signature Theatre
 Mark Minnick - Bandstand 2000 - West End Dinner Theatre
 Mercedes Ellington - Play On! - Arena Stage
 2002 Ilona Kessell - Damn Yankees - Toby's Dinner Theatre
 Ilona Kessell - Joseph and the Amazing Technicolor Dreamcoat - Toby's Dinner Theatre
 Irina Tsikurishvili - Don Quixote - Stanislavsky Theater Studio
 Marlies Yearby - The Oedipus Plays - Shakespeare Theatre
 Septime Webre - Coyote Builds America - Arena Stage
 2003 Irina Tsikurishvili - Hamlet - Synetic Theater
 Baayork Lee - South Pacific - Arena Stage
 Ilona Kessell - The Jazz Singer - Toby's Dinner Theatre
 Irina Tsikurishvili - Host and Guest - Synetic Theater
 Kelly Parsley - Tales from Ovid - The Theater Alliance
 Mark Minnick - Joseph and the Amazing Technicolor Dreamcoat - West End Dinner Theatre
 Sam Elmore - Tales from Ovid - The Theater Alliance

Outstanding Musical Direction in a Resident Production
 1998 Jon Kalbfleisch - Sunday in the Park With George - Arena Stage
 Jon Kalbfleisch - Sunday in the Park With George - Signature Theatre
 Buck Brown - Hair, The American Tribal Love-Rock Musical - The Studio Theatre Secondstage
 Dan Sticco - Old Wicked Songs - The Studio Theatre
 Douglas Lawler - It's a Wonderful Life - Toby's Dinner Theatre
 Michael Rice - Working - Signature Theatre
 1999 Anderson Edwards - Thunder Knocking on the Door - Arena Stage
 Buck Brown - Kerouac - The Studio Theatre Secondstage
 Douglas Lawler - Hot Nostalgia II - Toby's Dinner Theatre
 George Fulginiti-Shakar - Mad About the Bard - Folger Shakespeare Library
 Jon Kalbfleisch - A Little Night Music - Signature Theatre
 Jon Kalbfleisch - The Fix - Signature Theatre in association with Cameron Mackintosh
 2000 Kevin Campbell - The Dark Kalamazoo - Woolly Mammoth Theatre Company
 Danny Kosarin - Guys and Dolls - Arena Stage
 George Fulginiti-Shakar - Animal Crackers - Arena Stage
 Jon Kalbfleisch - Sweeney Todd - Signature Theatre
 William Knowles - Slam! - The Studio Theatre
 2001 Jason Robert Brown - Dinah Was - Arena Stage
 William Knowles - Dinah Was - Arena Stage
 David Maddox - Sing Down the Moon: Appalachian Wonder Tales - Theater of the First Amendment
 Deborah Wicks La Puma - Crack Between the Worlds: the goddess returns - The Studio Theatre Secondstage
 J. Leonard Oxley - Play On! - Arena Stage
 Jay Crowder - Side Show - Signature Theatre
 2002 Jon Kalbfleisch - Grand Hotel - Signature Theatre
 Dianne Adams McDowell - Constant Star - Arena Stage
 Dwight Andrews - Blues in the Night - Arena Stage
 George Fulginiti-Shakar - The Oedipus Plays - Shakespeare Theatre
 Jon Kalbfleisch - Putting it Together - Signature Theatre
 Larry Edward Vote - The Pirates of Penzance - Interact Theatre Company
 2003 Rob Berman - Sunday in the Park With George - The Kennedy Center
 Daniel Sticco - Bat Boy: The Musical - The Studio Theatre Secondstage
 George Fulginiti-Shakar - South Pacific - Arena Stage
 Johnathan Tunick - Company - The Kennedy Center
 Larry Blank - Sweeney Todd - The Kennedy Center
 Paul Raiman - The Gospel According to Fishman - Signature Theatre
 Stephen Wade - Polk County - Arena Stage
2011 George Fulginiti-Shakar - Oklahoma! - Arena Stage
Jon Kalbfleisch - Sunset Boulevard - Signature Theatre
Fred Lassen - Sycamore Trees - Signature Theatre
Konstantine Lortkipandze - Othello - Synetic Theater
Doug Peck - Candide - Shakespeare Theatre Company
Paul Sportelli - The Light in the Piazza - Arena Stage
James Sugg - Orestes, A Tragic Romp - Folger Theatre

Outstanding Musical Director of a Resident Musical
 1996 Dave Ferguson - Bessie's Blues - The Studio Theatre
 Jack Bashkow - Standup Shakespeare - Folger Shakespeare Library
 Jon Kalbfleisch - Cabaret - Signature Theatre
 Larry Edward Vote - H.M.S. Pinafore - Interact Theatre Company
 Tony Booker - Black Nativity - The Kennedy Center

Production Design

Outstanding Costume Design in a Resident Production
 1985 Marjorie Slaiman - Man and Superman - Arena Stage
 Anne Hould-Ward - King Lear - The Shakespeare Theatre
 Jared Aswegan - The Tempest - Arena Stage
 John Carver Sullivan - Much Ado About Nothing - The Shakespeare Theatre
 Laura Crow - Cloud 9 - Arena Stage
 Marjorie Slaiman - Happy End - Arena Stage
 1986 Holly Cole - The Merry Wives of Windsor - The Shakespeare Theatre
 Elizabeth Covey - A Midsummer Night's Dream - The Shakespeare Theatre
 Kate Corbley - The Miss Firecracker Contest - Olney Theatre
 Kurt Wilhelm - The Count of Monte Cristo - American National Theatre
 Marjorie Slaiman - Women and Water - Arena Stage
 Miruna Boruzescu - Tartuffe - Arena Stage
 1987 Martin Pakledinaz - The Piggy Bank - Arena Stage
 Mark Pirolo - The Cherry Orchard - The Shakespeare Theatre
 Martin Pakledinaz - The Taming of the Shrew - Arena Stage
 Rosemary Pardee - The Water Engine - Round House Theatre
 William Schroder - The Miser - The Shakespeare Theatre
 1988 Rosemary Pardee - Filthy Rich - Round House Theatre
 Jane Greenwood - The Winter's Tale - The Shakespeare Theatre
 Marjorie Slaiman - Heartbreak House - Arena Stage
 Marjorie Slaiman - Light Up the Sky - Arena Stage
 Martin Pakledinaz - All's Well That Ends Well - The Shakespeare Theatre
 1989 William Pucilowsky - The Constant Wife - The Washington Stage Guild
 Marjorie Slaiman - Enrico IV - Arena Stage
 Martin Pakledinaz - The Cocoanuts - Arena Stage
 Smaranda Branescu - Macbeth - The Shakespeare Theatre
 Smaranda Branescu - Six Characters in Search of an Author - Arena Stage
 Susan Hirschfeld - The Merchant of Venice - The Shakespeare Theatre
 1990 Jane Schloss Phelan - Heathen Valley - Round House Theatre
 Ellen McCartney - The Beggar's Opera - The Shakespeare Theatre
 Marjorie Slaiman - The Man Who Came to Dinner - Arena Stage
 Martin Pakledinaz - Twelfth Night - The Shakespeare Theatre
 Rosemary Pardee - Lucky Stiff - Round House Theatre
 Zack Brown - On the Town - Arena Stage
 1991 Martin Pakledinaz - Mary Stuart - The Shakespeare Theatre
 Catherine Zuber - The Merry Wives of Windsor - The Shakespeare Theatre
 Marjorie Slaiman - Juno and the Paycock - Arena Stage
 Merrily Murray-Walsh - Richard III - The Shakespeare Theatre
 Paul Tazewell - The Caucasian Chalk Circle - Arena Stage
 Ric Thomas Rice - Frankie and Johnny in the Clair de Lune - The Studio Theatre
 1992 Barbra Kravitz - Pygmalion - Arena Stage
 Barbra Kravitz - Saint Joan - The Shakespeare Theatre
 Don Newcomb - The Women - The Studio Theatre
 Martin Pakledinaz - King Lear - The Shakespeare Theatre
 Regula Schmid - Amor de Don Perlimplin con Belisa en su Jardin - GALA Hispanic Theatre
 1993 Paul Tazewell - The African Company Presents "Richard III" - Arena Stage
 Catherine Zuber - Hamlet - The Shakespeare Theatre
 Lynnie Raybuck - Frankenstein (Playing with Fire) - Washington Shakespeare Company
 Marjorie Slaiman - Of Thee I Sing - Arena Stage
 Martin Pakledinaz - Much Ado About Nothing - The Shakespeare Theatre
 Paul Tazewell - The Way of the World - Arena Stage
 1994 Reggie Ray - Spunk - The Studio Theatre
 Howard Vincent Kurtz - Strindberg in Hollywood - Woolly Mammoth Theatre Company
 Marina Draghici - It's the Truth (If You Think It Is) - Arena Stage
 Rosemary Pardee - Lend Me a Tenor - Olney Theatre
 Theresa Chevine - Vampires Lesbians of Sodom and Sleeping Beauty or Coma - Fourth Wall Productions
 Tom Broecker - Richard II - The Shakespeare Theatre
 1995 Howard Vincent Kurtz - Dream of a Common Language - Theater of the First Amendment
 Jess Goldstein - Hot Mikado - Ford's Theatre
 Patricia Zipprodt - The School for Scandal - The Shakespeare Theatre
 Paul Tazewell - The Odyssey - Arena Stage
 Paul Tazewell - The Revengers' Comedies - Arena Stage
 Reggie Ray - God's Trombones - DC ART/WORKS
 1996 Anita Stewart - Love's Labor's Lost - The Shakespeare Theatre
 Lindsay W. Davis - A Month in the Country - Arena Stage
 Paul Tazewell - The Matchmaker - Arena Stage
 Reggie Ray - Black Nativity - The Kennedy Center
 Rosemary Pardee - When We Are Married - Olney Theatre Center for the Arts
 1997 Martin Pakledinaz - Volpone - The Shakespeare Theatre
 Andrew V. Yelusich - All's Well That Ends Well - The Shakespeare Theatre
 Paul Tazewell - Blithe Spirit - Arena Stage
 Robin Stapley - Quills - Woolly Mammoth Theatre Company
 Rosemary Pardee - The Mikado - Interact Theatre Company
 Zack Brown - Candide - Arena Stage
 1998 Jane Greenwood - Mourning Becomes Electra - The Shakespeare Theatre
 Jane Shafer - The Wizard of Oz - Toby's Dinner Theatre
 Jule Emerson - The Importance of Being Earnest - Olney Theatre Center for the Arts
 Patricia Zipprodt - Sunday in the Park With George - Arena Stage
 Patricia Zipprodt - Sunday in the Park With George - Signature Theatre
 Rosemary Pardee - The Rehearsal - Round House Theatre
 1999 Paul Tazewell - Peer Gynt - The Shakespeare Theatre
 Anne Kennedy - The Fix - Signature Theatre in association with Cameron Mackintosh
 Natasha Djukic - Quartet - Open Theatre/TUTA
 Reggie Ray - The Old Settler - The Studio Theatre
 Robert Perdziola - A Woman of No Importance - The Shakespeare Theatre
 Robin Stapley - Camille - Olney Theatre Center for the Arts
 2000 Helen Q. Huang - Indian Ink - The Studio Theatre
 Alessandra D'Ovidio - La Dama Boba - GALA Hispanic Theatre
 Justine Scherer - Renard the Fox - Le Neon Theatre
 Martin Pakledinaz - The Merchant of Venice - The Shakespeare Theatre
 Paul Tazewell - The Women - Arena Stage
 Zack Brown - The Royal Family - Arena Stage
 2001 Robert Perdziola - The Country Wife - The Shakespeare Theatre
 Anne Kennedy - Side Show - Signature Theatre
 Debra Bauer - Blue - Arena Stage
 Howard Tsvi Kaplan - Man of La Mancha - Olney Theatre Center for the Arts
 Murell Horton - Camino Real - The Shakespeare Theatre
 Rosemary Pardee - The Great White Hope - Arena Stage
 2002 Robert Perdziola - Don Carlos - Shakespeare Theatre
 Jelena Vukmirovic - Perseus Bayou - Theatre of the First Amendment
 Justine Light and Lucas Maroney - God of Vengeance - Rorschach Theatre
 Lindsay W. Davis - Agamemnon and His Daughters - Arena Stage
 Murell Horton - Hedda Gabler - Shakespeare Theatre
 Susan E. Mickey - Blues in the Night - Arena Stage
 2003 Jelena Vukmirovic and Marie Schneggenberger - Mississippi Pinocchio - Theater of the First Amendment
 Alessandra D'Ovidio - La Verdad Sospechosa - Gala Hispanic Theatre
 Catherine Zuber - Much Ado about Nothing - The Shakespeare Theatre
 Catherine Zuber - The Winter's Tale - The Shakespeare Theatre
 Deborah M. Dryden - The Misanthrope - Arena Stage
 Mariana Fernandez - La Verdad Sospechosa - Gala Hispanic Theatre
 Robert Perdziola - The Duchess of Malfi - The Shakespeare Theatre
 2004  Paul Tazewell - Camelot - Arena Stage
 Jess Goldstein - Shakespeare in Hollywood - Arena Stage
 Constance Hoffman - A Midsummer Night's Dream - The Shakespeare Theatre
 Robert Perdziola - Follies - Signature Theatre
 Robert Perdziola - The Rivals - Signature Theatre
 2005  Gregg Barnes - Allegro - Signature Theatre
 Mara Blumenfeld - Pericles - The Shakespeare Theatre
 Zack Brown - The Importance of Being Earnest - Arena Stage
 Robert Perdziola - Cyrano - The Shakespeare Theatre
 Emilio Sosa - Señor Discretion Himself - Arena Stage
 Kate Turner-Walker - The Two Gentlemen of Verona - Folger Theatre
 2006 Robert Perdziola - Lady Windermere's Fan - Shakespeare Theatre Company
 Zack Brown - Comedy of Errors - Shakespeare Theatre Company
 Jess Goldstein - Othello - Shakespeare Theatre Company
 Murell Horton - Lorenzaccio - Shakespeare Theatre Company
 Anne Kennedy - Urenetown - Signature Theatre
 Rosemary Pardee - Camille - Round House Theatre
 James Schuette - Intimations for Saxophone - Arena Stage
 2007  Catherine Zuber - Love's Labor's Lost - Shakespeare Theatre Company
 Toni-Leslie James - 3 Mo' Divas - Arena Stage
 Anna R. Oliver - Don Juan - Shakespeare Theatre Company
 Robert Perdziola - The Beaux' Stratagem - Shakespeare Theatre Company
 Kate Turner-Walker - A Midsummer Night's Dream - Folger Theatre
 2008 Reggie Ray - Souvenir, A Fantasia on the Life of Florence Foster Jenkins - Studio Theatre
 Murell Horten- Edward II - Shakespeare Theatre Company
 Jennifer Moeller - Tamburlaine - Shakespeare Theatre Company
 Anastasia Ryurikov Simes - Macbeth - Synetic Theater
 Paul Tazewell - Carnival! - The Kennedy Center

Outstanding Lighting Design in a Resident Production
 1985 Daniel MacLean Wagner - My Sister in This House - The Studio Theatre
 Allen Lee Hughes - Passion Play - Arena Stage
 Frances Aronson - Happy End - Arena Stage
 Frances Aronson - The Tempest - Arena Stage
 Nancy Schertler - Lydie Breeze - New Playwrights' Theatre
 Stuart Duke - King Lear - The Shakespeare Theatre
 1986 James F. Ingalls - The Count of Monte Cristo - American National Theatre
 Allen Lee Hughes - Women and Water - Arena Stage
 Beverly Emmons - Tartuffe - Arena Stage
 Richard Winkler - A Midsummer Night's Dream - The Shakespeare Theatre
 Stuart Duke - A Walk Out of Water - The Studio Theatre
 Stuart Duke - Othello - The Shakespeare Theatre
 1987 James F. Ingalls - Ajax - American National Theatre
 Beverly Emmons - The Wild Duck - Arena Stage
 Daniel MacLean Wagner - The Birthday Party - The Studio Theatre
 Frances Aronson - Measure for Measure - Arena Stage
 Nancy Schertler - Old Times - Arena Stage
 Nancy Schertler - Romeo and Juliet - The Shakespeare Theatre
 1988 Daniel MacLean Wagner - The Entertainer - The Studio Theatre
 Allen Lee Hughes - All the King's Men - Arena Stage
 Daniel MacLean Wagner - As Is - The Studio Theatre
 Nancy Schertler - Crime and Punishment - Arena Stage
 Nancy Schertler - The Winter's Tale - The Shakespeare Theatre
 Richard H. Young - Filthy Rich - Round House Theatre
 1989 Allen Lee Hughes - Six Characters in Search of an Author - Arena Stage
 Daniel MacLean Wagner - Eleemosynary - Horizons Theatre
 Daniel MacLean Wagner - On the Verge or The Geography of Yearning - Round House Theatre
 Nancy Schertler - Aunt Dan & Lemon - Woolly Mammoth Theatre Company
 Nancy Schertler - Playboy of the West Indies - Arena Stage
 Stephen Strawbridge - Macbeth - The Shakespeare Theatre
 1990 Allen Lee Hughes - A Midsummer Night's Dream - Arena Stage
 Allen Lee Hughes - On the Town - Arena Stage
 Daniel MacLean Wagner - The Beggar's Opera - The Shakespeare Theatre
 Nancy Schertler - A Lie of the Mind - Arena Stage
 Nancy Schertler - The Glass Menagerie - Arena Stage
 Nancy Schertler - Twelfth Night - The Shakespeare Theatre
 1991 Howell Binkley - Richard III - The Shakespeare Theatre
 Allen Lee Hughes - Juno and the Paycock - Arena Stage
 Christopher Townsend - Angel - No-Neck Monsters Theatre Company
 Daniel MacLean Wagner - Frankie and Johnnie in the Clair de Lune - The Studio Theatre
 Donald Holder - Stand-Up Tragedy - Arena Stage
 Nancy Schertler - The Caucasian Chalk Circle - Arena Stage
 1992 Daniel MacLean Wagner - When I Was a Girl I Used to Scream and Shout - The Studio Theatre
 David R. Zemmels - Bloody Poetry - Washington Shakespeare Company
 Howell Binkley - King Lear - The Shakespeare Theatre
 John Burchett - Sweeney Todd - Signature Theatre
 Nancy Schertler - The Time of Your Life - Arena Stage
 Thomas F. Donahue - Odd Jobs - Round House Theatre
 1993 Howell Binkley - Hamlet - The Shakespeare Theatre
 Daniel MacLean Wagner - Prelude to a Kiss - Olney Theatre
 David R. Zemmels - The Einstein Project - Theater of the First Amendment
 Nancy Schertler - In Living Colors - Theater of the First Amendment
 Nancy Schertler - Troilus and Cressida - The Shakespeare Theatre
 1994 Deirdre Kelly Lavrakas - El Beso de la Mujer Ara1a - GALA Hispanic Theatre
 Kim Peter Kovac - El Beso de la Mujer Ara1a - GALA Hispanic Theatre
 Daniel MacLean Wagner - Shadowlands - Olney Theatre
 Daniel MacLean Wagner - The Comedy of Errors - The Shakespeare Theatre
 Daniel Schrader - Two Rooms - Round House Theatre
 Kim Peter Kovac - Our Country's Good - Signature Theatre
 1995 Daniel MacLean Wagner - Someone Who'll Watch Over Me - The Studio Theatre
 Allen Lee Hughes - The Odyssey - Arena Stage
 Howell Binkley - Henry IV - The Shakespeare Theatre
 Martha Mountain - Dream of a Common Language - Theater of the First Amendment
 Nancy Schertler - A Small World - Arena Stage
 1996 Howell Binkley - Macbeth - The Shakespeare Theatre
 Daniel MacLean Wagner - A Streetcar Named Desire - Olney Theatre Center for the Arts
 Daniel MacLean Wagner - Conversations with My Father - The Studio Theatre
 Daniel MacLean Wagner - The Passion of Dracula - Olney Theatre Center for the Arts
 Howell Binkley - Henry V - The Shakespeare Theatre
 Nancy Schertler - The Waiting Room - Arena Stage
 1997 Daniel MacLean Wagner - Broken Glass - Olney Theatre Center for the Arts
 Daniel MacLean Wagner - Broken Glass - The Rep Stage Company
 Ayun Fedorcha - La Chunga - GALA Hispanic Theatre
 Daniel MacLean Wagner - Passion - Signature Theatre
 James F. Ingalls - Antony and Cleopatra - The Shakespeare Theatre
 Jennifer Tipton - Dance of Death - Arena Stage
 Marianne Meadows - Quills - Woolly Mammoth Theatre Company
 1998 Howell Binkley - The Tempest - The Shakespeare Theatre
 Allen Lee Hughes - Sunday in the Park With George - Arena Stage
 Allen Lee Hughes - Sunday in the Park With George - Signature Theatre
 Howell Binkley - Mourning Becomes Electra - The Shakespeare Theatre
 Jeff Hill - Never the Sinner - Rep Stage
 Jeff Hill - Never the Sinner - Signature Theatre
 Marianne Meadows - Old Wicked Songs - The Studio Theatre
 1999 Daniel MacLean Wagner - Nijinsky's Last Dance - Signature Theatre
 Dan Covey - Dangerous Liaisons - Rep Stage
 Dan Covey - Dangerous Liaisons - Source Theatre Company
 Daniel MacLean Wagner - The Fix - Signature Theatre in association with Cameron Mackintosh
 Howell Binkley - Peer Gynt - The Shakespeare Theatre
 Howell Binkley - Sweet Bird of Youth - The Shakespeare Theatre
 Michael Giannitti - Seven Guitars - The Studio Theatre
 2000 Jay A. Herzog - Ambrosio - Rep Stage
 Dan Covey - Edmond - Source Theatre Company
 Daniel MacLean Wagner - A Midsummer Night's Dream - The Shakespeare Theatre
 Daniel MacLean Wagner - Sweeney Todd - Signature Theatre
 Howell Binkley - The Merchant of Venice - The Shakespeare Theatre
 Marianne Meadows - The Adding Machine - Washington Jewish Theatre
 2001 Dan Covey - The Tempest - Folger Theatre
 Allen Lee Hughes - K2 - Arena Stage
 Dan Covey - Leaving the Summer Land - Tribute Productions
 Daniel MacLean Wagner - Therese Raquin - Olney Theatre Center for the Arts
 Jonathan Blandin - Available Light - Signature Theatre
 Jonathan Blandin - The Mystery of Irma Vep (a penny dreadful) - Rep Stage
 2002 Chris Parry - Don Carlos - Shakespeare Theatre
 Dan Covey - Macbeth - Folger Theatre
 Marcus Dilliard - The Oedipus Plays - Shakespeare Theatre
 Marianne Meadows - The Chosen - Theatre J
 Nancy Schertler - Tom Walker - Arena Stage
 Pavel Dobrusky - Agamemnon and His Daughters - Arena Stage
 2003 Howell Binkley - Sweeney Todd - The Kennedy Center
 Amy Appleyard - The Duchess of Malfi - The Shakespeare Theatre
 Chris Lee - Hedwig and the Angry Inch - Signature Theatre
 Daniel MacLean Wagner - Gospel According to Fishman - Signature Theatre
 Howell Binkley - Sunday in the Park With George - The Kennedy Center
 Jonathan Blandin - The Weir - Round House Theatre
 2004 Daniel MacLean Wagner - "The Drawer Boy" - Round House Theatre
 Dan Covey - "The Return to Morality" - Rep Stage
 Dan Covey - "Slaughter City" - Theater Alliance
 Chris Lee - "Follies" - Signature Theatre
 Mark McCullough - "Richard III" - Shakespeare Theatre Company
 2005 Daniel MacLean Wagner - "The Diary of Anne Frank" - Round House Theatre
 Dan Covey - "Mary's Wedding" - Theater Alliance
 Dan Covey - "Merlin and the Cave of Dreams" - Imagination Stage
 T.J. Gerckens - "Pericles" - The Shakespeare Theatre
 Tim Mitchell - "Henry IV, Part 1" - Shakespeare Theatre Company
 Tim Mitchell - "Henry IV, Part 2" - Shakespeare Theatre Company
 2006 Charlie Morrison - "The Tempest" - Shakespeare Theatre Company
 Colin K. Bills - "A Clean House" - Woolly Mammoth Theatre Company
 Dan Covey - "Hannah & Martin" - Theater J
 Allen Lee Hughes - "Comedy of Errors" - Shakespeare Theatre Company
 Chris Lee - "Urinetown" - Signature Theatre
 Charlie Morrison - "Oliver!" - Olney Theatre Center
 Charlie Morrison - "Othello" - Shakespeare Theatre Company
 Daniel MacLean Wagner - "Camille" - Round House Theatre
 2007 Charlie Morrison - "The Elephant Man" - Olney Theatre Center
 Colin K. Bills - "The Dybbuk" - Synetic Theater and Theater J
 Colin K. Bills - "Frankenstein" - Synetic Theater as part of The Kennedy Center’s Prelude Festival
 John Hoey - "Measure for Measure" - Folger Theatre
 Charlie Morrison - "An Enemy of the People" - Shakespeare Theatre Company

Outstanding Set Design in a Resident Production
 1985 Lewis Folden - Lydie Breeze - New Playwrights' Theatre
 John Arnone - Happy End - Arena Stage
 Loren Sherman - Passion Play - Arena Stage
 Russell Metheny - King Lear - The Shakespeare Theatre
 Russell Metheny - My Sister in This House - The Studio Theatre
 William Barclay - Much Ado About Nothing - The Shakespeare Theatre
 1986 Russell Metheny - A Walk Out of Water - The Studio Theatre
 George Tsypin - The Count of Monte Cristo - American National Theatre
 John Arnone - The Good Person of Setzuan - Arena Stage
 Patricia Woodbridge - Isn't It Romantic - Arena Stage
 Radu Boruzescu - Tartuffe - Arena Stage
 Russell Metheny - March of the Falsettos - The Studio Theatre
 1987 Radu Boruzescu - The Wild Duck - Arena Stage
 George Tsypin - Idiot's Delight - American National Theatre
 Jane Williams Flank - Sally and Marsha - Round House Theatre
 John Arnone - The Piggy Bank - Arena Stage
 Richard H. Young - The Water Engine - Round House Theatre
 Russell Metheny - Slab Boys - The Studio Theatre
 1988 Russell Metheny - All's Well That Ends Well - The Shakespeare Theatre
 Jane Williams Flank - Filthy Rich - Round House Theatre
 Karl Eigsti - Heartbreak House - Arena Stage
 Matthew Cooper - Marathon '33 - Horizons Theatre
 Russell Metheny - North Shore Fish - The Studio Theatre
 Russell Metheny - The Entertainer - The Studio Theatre
 1989 Russell Metheny - Eleemosynary - Horizons Theatre
 Adrianne Lobel - Playboy of the West Indies - Arena Stage
 Liviu Ciulei - Six Characters in Search of an Author - Arena Stage
 Michael Yeargan - Macbeth - The Shakespeare Theatre
 Thomas Lynch - The Cocoanuts - Arena Stage
 1990 James Kronzer - The Return of Herbert Bracewell - Olney Theatre
 Derek McLane - Twelfth Night - The Shakespeare Theatre
 John Arnone - Nothing Sacred - Arena Stage
 Russell Metheny - Principia Scriptoriae - The Studio Theatre
 Russell Metheny - The Common Pursuit - The Studio Theatre
 Zack Brown - On the Town - Arena Stage
 1991 Frank Hallinan-Flood - Juno and the Paycock - Arena Stage
 Derek McLane - Richard III - The Shakespeare Theatre
 Jane Williams Flank - Rebel Armies Deep Into Chad - Round House Theatre
 Michael Layton - Made in Bangkok - The Studio Theatre
 Russell Metheny - The Secret Rapture - Olney Theatre
 1992 Lou Stancari - Sweeney Todd - Signature Theatre
 Frank Hallinan-Flood - She Stoops to Conquer - Arena Stage
 Hal Crawford - Ardiente Paciencia - GALA Hispanic Theatre
 James Kronzer - Apocalyptic Butterflies - Round House Theatre
 James Kronzer - Love and Anger - Round House Theatre
 Russell Metheny - The Women - The Studio Theatre
 1993 James Kronzer - The Lisbon Traviata - The Studio Theatre
 Derek McLane - Much Ado About Nothing - The Shakespeare Theatre
 James Kronzer - Prelude to a Kiss - Olney Theatre
 Jr.,Joseph B. Musumeci - Elektra - Round House Theatre
 Lou Stancari - Assassins - Signature Theatre
 Lou Stancari - Billy Nobody - Woolly Mammoth Theatre Company
 1994 Linda Buchanan - Dancing at Lughnasa - Arena Stage
 Frank Hallinan-Flood - Julius Caesar - The Shakespeare Theatre
 James Kronzer - Criminals in Love - Round House Theatre
 James Wolk - Lettice and Lovage - Folger Shakespeare Library
 James Wolk - Lettice and Lovage - Interact Theatre Company
 Russell Metheny - The Caretaker - The Studio Theatre
 Russell Metheny - The Comedy of Errors - The Shakespeare Theatre
 1995 James Kronzer - Dream of a Common Language - Theater of the First Amendment
 Derek McLane - The Doctor's Dilemma - The Shakespeare Theatre
 James Kronzer - Someone Who'll Watch Over Me - The Studio Theatre
 James Kronzer - The Night of the Iguana - Olney Theatre Center for the Arts
 Lou Stancari - Into the Woods - Signature Theatre
 Loy Arcenas - Misalliance - Arena Stage
 1996 James Kronzer - Conversations with My Father - The Studio Theatre
 James Kronzer - A Streetcar Named Desire - Olney Theatre Center for the Arts
 James Kronzer - The Pitchfork Disney - Woolly Mammoth Theatre Company
 Lou Stancari - Cabaret - Signature Theatre
 Ming Cho Lee - Macbeth - The Shakespeare Theatre
 Russell Metheny - Three Sisters - The Studio Theatre
 1997 John Conklin - Dance of Death - Arena Stage
 Daniel Conway - subUrbia - The Studio Theatre
 James Kronzer - Broken Glass - Olney Theatre Center for the Arts
 James Kronzer - Broken Glass - The Rep Stage Company
 Lou Stancari - Passion - Signature Theatre
 Michael Yeargan - Antony and Cleopatra - The Shakespeare Theatre
 1998 Tony Cisek - Things That Break - Theater of the First Amendment
 James Kronzer - Love! Valour! Compassion! - The Studio Theatre
 James Kronzer - Old Wicked Songs - The Studio Theatre
 John Arnone - The Tempest - The Shakespeare Theatre
 Ming Cho Lee - Mourning Becomes Electra - The Shakespeare Theatre
 Zack Brown - Sunday in the Park With George - Arena Stage
 Zack Brown - Sunday in the Park With George - Signature Theatre
 1999 Tony Cisek - Much Ado About Nothing - Folger Shakespeare Library
 Daniel Conway - Seven Guitars - The Studio Theatre
 James Kronzer - The Merry Wives of Windsor - The Shakespeare Theatre
 Lou Stancari - The Fix - Signature Theatre in association with Cameron Mackintosh
 Thomas Lynch - You Can't Take It With You - Arena Stage
 Tony Cisek - Pericles - Washington Shakespeare Company
 2000 Daniel Conway - Ambrosio - Rep Stage
 Daniel Conway - The Desk Set - The Studio Theatre
 Lou Stancari - Sweeney Todd - Signature Theatre
 Ming Cho Lee - The Merchant of Venice - The Shakespeare Theatre
 Russell Metheny - Indian Ink - The Studio Theatre
 Tony Cisek - Communicating Doors - Round House Theatre
 2001 Tony Cisek - Leaving the Summer Land - Tribute Productions
 James Kronzer - Collected Stories - Theater J
 James Leonard Joy - Blue - Arena Stage
 Lou Stancari - The Mystery of Irma Vep (a penny dreadful) - Rep Stage
 Ming Cho Lee - K2 - Arena Stage
 Russell Metheny - bash: latterday plays - The Studio Theatre
 Walt Spangler - Timon of Athens - The Shakespeare Theatre
 2002 Ming Cho Lee - Don Carlos - Shakespeare Theatre
 Tony Cisek - The Judas Kiss - Rep Stage Company
 Daniel Conway - Jitney - Studio Theatre
 Greg Mitchell - American Mara: The Ugly Girlfriend - Bald Spot Theatre
 James Kronzer - In the Garden - Signature Theatre
 Pavel Dobrusky - Agamemnon and His Daughters - Arena Stage
 2003 Hugh Landwehr - The Little Foxes - The Shakespeare Theatre
 James Kronzer - Shakespeare, Moses, and Joe Papp - Round House Theatre
 Debra Booth - Hambone - The Studio Theatre
 Jos B. Musumeci - The Weir - Round House Theatre
 Loy Arcenas - True West - Arena Stage
 Walt Spangler - The Duchess of Malfi - The Shakespeare Theatre

Outstanding Sound Design, Resident Play or Musical
 1990 Neil McFadden - Heathen Valley - Round House Theatre
 David Crandall - The Stick Wife - Horizons Theatre
 Mark Menna - Bluesman - Source Theatre Company
 Susan R. White - A Lie of the Mind - Arena Stage
 Susan R. White - On the Town - Arena Stage
 1991 Susan R. White - Stand-Up Tragedy - Arena Stage
 Gil Thompson - West Memphis Mojo - The Studio Theatre
 Jerzy Sapieyevski - Richard III - The Shakespeare Theatre
 Neil McFadden - Zero Positive - Woolly Mammoth Theatre Company
 Susan R. White - Angel - No-Neck Monsters Theatre Company
 1992 David Crandall - Hamlet - Washington Shakespeare Company
 David Crandall - Ardiente Paciencia - GALA Hispanic Theatre
 David Crandall - Julius Caesar - Washington Shakespeare Company
 Edward Morgan and Neil McFadden - The Illusion - Round House Theatre
 Susan R. White - The Seagull - Arena Stage
 1993 Jens McVoy - The Einstein Project - Theater of the First Amendment
 Adam Wernick - Hamlet - The Shakespeare Theatre
 Robin M. Heath - The Father with The Stronger - Arena Stage
 Ron Ursano - African Tourist - Woolly Mammoth Theatre Company
 Susan R. White - The Visit - Arena Stage
 1994 Keith Thomas - Julius Caesar - The Shakespeare Theatre
 Adam Wernick - Richard II - The Shakespeare Theatre
 David Maddox and Robin M. Heath - Edward II - Washington Shakespeare Company
 David Maddox - Porcelain - Consenting Adults Theatre Company
 George Fulginiti-Shakar - The Comedy of Errors - The Shakespeare Theatre
 Rob Milburn - Dancing at Lughnasa - Arena Stage
 1995 Richard Woodbury - Wings - Signature Theatre
  Klimchak - No Exit - Le Neon French-American Theatre
 David E. Smith - The Revengers' Comedies - Arena Stage
 Mark K. Anduss - Dream of a Common Language - Theater of the First Amendment
 Neil McFadden - The Swan - Round House Theatre
 1996 Daniel Schrader - The Pitchfork Disney - Woolly Mammoth Theatre Company
 Ben Zastrow - Marisol - Potomac Theatre Project
 David Maddox and Gil Thompson - Rhinoceros - The Studio Theatre
 John Gottlieb and Mitchell Greenhill - The Waiting Room - Arena Stage
 Ron Ursano/The Chroma Group - On the Open Road - The Actors' Theatre of Washington
 1997 Bruce Odland - Dance of Death - Arena Stage
 Daniel Schrader - Cymbeline - Washington Shakespeare Company
 David Maddox - The Wonderful One-Hoss Shay - Theater of the First Amendment
 Rob Milburn - The Miser - Arena Stage
 Scott Burgess - Quills - Woolly Mammoth Theatre Company
 1998 Scott Burgess - Romeo and Juliet - Folger Shakespeare Library
 David Maddox - Never the Sinner - Rep Stage
 David Maddox - Never the Sinner - Signature Theatre
 David Maddox - Things That Break - Theater of the First Amendment
 Gil Thompson - Old Wicked Songs - The Studio Theatre
 Gregory Brian (now Brian Mac Ian) and Mitch Finegold - The Fall of the House of Usher - Fraudulent Productions
 Scott Burgess - Travels With My Aunt - Rep Stage
 1999 David Maddox - Nijinsky's Last Dance - Signature Theatre
 Brian D. Keating - Neville's Island - Rep Stage
 Gil Thompson and Scott Burgess - Seven Guitars - The Studio Theatre
 Neil McFadden - Jack & Jill - Round House Theatre
 Red Ramona - The Merry Wives of Windsor - The Shakespeare Theatre
 Scott W. Edwards and Timothy M. Thompson - You Can't Take It With You - Arena Stage
 2000 Gil Thompson and Ronobir Lahiri - Indian Ink - The Studio Theatre
 David Maddox - Grimm Tales - Theater of the First Amendment
 Ltd.,Ron Ursano/The Chroma Group - Angels in America, Part II: Perestroika - Signature Theatre
 Mark K. Anduss - The Last Orbit of Billy Mars - Woolly Mammoth Theatre Company
 Neil McFadden - The Dead Monkey - Woolly Mammoth Theatre Company
 Scott Burgess - The Adding Machine - Washington Jewish Theatre
 2001 Scott Burgess - The Tempest - Folger Theatre
 Brian Keating - Floyd Collins - Signature Theatre
 Brian Keating - In The Absence of Spring - Signature Theatre
 Hana Sellers - Wonder of the World - Woolly Mammoth Theatre Company
 Scott Burgess - The Mystery of Irma Vep (a penny dreadful) - Rep Stage
 2002 Daniel Portaix - Les Cloisons (Partitions) - Le Neon Theatre
 Fabian Obispo - Agamemnon and His Daughters - Arena Stage
 Gil Thompson - The Invention of Love - Studio Theatre
 Mark K. Anduss - Andromeda Shack - Woolly Mammoth Theatre Company
 Martin Desjardins - Hamlet - Shakespeare Theatre
 Tony Angelini - Home - Round House Theatre
 2003 Mark Anduss - Tiny Alice - Washington Shakespeare Company
 Adam Wernick - The Diaries - Signature Theatre
 David McKeever - Scotland Road - Olney Theatre Center for the Arts
 David McKeever - The After-Dinner Joke - Potomac Theatre Project
 Paata Tsikurishvili - Host and Guest - Synetic Theater
 Scott Burgess - Knoyugogh - Little Globe Theater
 Scott Burgess - Othello - Folger Theatre
 2004 Martin Desjardins - A Midsummer Night's Dream - The Shakespeare Theatre
 Martin Desjardins - Richard III - The Shakespeare Theatre
 Scott Burgess - Elizabeth the Queen - Folger Theatre
 Chas Marsh - The Dazzle - Rep Stage
 Neil McFadden - The Drawer Boy - Round House Theatre
 Ryan Rumery - Thief River - Theatre Alliance
 2005 Martin Desjardins - The Diary of Anne Frank - Round House Theatre
 Martin Desjardins - MacBeth - The Shakespeare Theatre
 Mark K Anduss - Mary's Wedding - Theatre Alliance
 Irakli Kavsadze - The Master and Margarita - Synetic Theatre
 Ron Oshima - Porcelain - Tsunami Theatre Company
 Paata Tskurishvili - The Master and Margarita - Synetc Theatre
 2006 Martin Desjardins - columbinus (World Premiere) - Round House Theatre
 Martin Desjardins- Othello - Shakespeare Theatre Company
 Michael Bodeen - The Tempest - Shakespeare Theatre Company
 Rob Milburn - The Tempest - Shakespeare Theatre Company
 Dan Murphy - Moby Dick Rehearsed - The American Century Theatre
 Darron L West - Imitations for Saxophone - Arena Stage
 2007 Matthew M Nielson - A Prayer For Owen Meany - Round House Theatre
 Martin Desjardins - An Enemy of the People - Shakespeare Theatre Company
 Irakli Kavsadze - Frankenstein - Synetic Theatre/Kennedy Center Prelude Festival
 Neil McFadden - A Midsummer Night's Dream - Folger Theatre
 Michael Roth - The Persians - Shakespeare Theatre Company
 Paata Tsikurishvili - Frankenstein - Synetic Theatre/Kennedy Center Prelude Festival
 2008 Irakli Kavsadze - MacBeth - Synetic Theatre
 Jeremy Lee - The Studio - Signature Theatre
 Matthew M Nielson - Nest - Signature Theatre
 Matthew M Nielson - the unmentionables - Woolly Mammoth Theatre Company
 Ryan Rumery - Vigils - Woolly Mammoth Theatre Company
 Gil Thompson - Souvenir: A Fantasia on the Life of Florence Foster Jenkins - Studio Theatre
 Paata Tsikurishvili - MacBeth - Synetic Theatre
 2009 Matthew M Nielson - 1984 - Catalyst Theater
 Karin Graybash - MacBeth - Folger Theatre and Two River Theatre Company
 Irakli Kavsadze - Romeo and Juliet - Synetic Theatre Mainstage
 Konstantine Lortkipanidze - Romeo and Juliet - Synetic Theatre Mainstage
 Neil McFadden - Boom - Woolly Mammoth Theatre Company
 Ryan Rumery - Stunning - Wooly Mammoth Theatre Company
 Kenny Wollesen - MacBeth - Folger Theatre and Two River Theatre Company

See also
Helen Hayes Awards Non-Resident Acting
Helen Hayes Awards Non-Resident Production
Helen Hayes Awards Resident Acting
Helen Hayes Awards Resident Production

Sources
 

Helen Hayes Awards